Livin' for You is the seventh album from soul musician Al Green.  Released in 1973 it includes the hit title track and "Let's Get Married."  The album cracked the Top 25 in the Billboard Pop Albums chart and was the fourth album from the artist to peak at #1 on the Soul Albums chart.

Track listing
Side one
 "Livin' for You" (Al Green, Willie Mitchell) - 3:12
 "Home Again" (Green) - 3:59
 "Free at Last" (Green) - 3:30
 "Let's Get Married" (Green) - 5:36
 "So Good to Be Here" (Green, Michael Allen) - 2:47

Side two
 "Sweet Sixteen" (Green) - 3:30
 "Unchained Melody" (Alex North, Hy Zaret) - 5:35
 "My God Is Real" (Green, Kenneth Morris) - 2:43
 "Beware" (Green) - 8:20

Personnel
Al Green - vocals
Teenie Hodges - guitar
Leroy Hodges - bass
Charles Hodges - piano, organ
Al Jackson, Jr. - drums
Howard Grimes - drums, congas
Archie Turner, James Brown, Michael Allen - piano
Charles Chalmers, Donna Rhodes, Sandra Rhodes - backing vocals
Andrew Love, Ed Logan - tenor saxophone
James Mitchell - baritone saxophone
Wayne Jackson - trumpet
Jack Hale, Sr. - trombone
The Memphis Strings - strings
Technical
Vince Biondi - art direction
Tom Daly - cover illustration

Later samples
"Free at Last"
"Blueprint (Momma Loves Me)" by Jay-Z from the album The Blueprint
"No One Else" by Mary J. Blige from the album My Life
"Living This Life" by UGK from the album UGK (Underground Kingz)

See also
List of number-one R&B albums of 1974 (U.S.)

References

1973 albums
Al Green albums
Albums produced by Willie Mitchell (musician)
Hi Records albums